Thomas White (birth unknown – death unknown) was an English rugby union and professional rugby league footballer who played in the 1900s and 1910s.

Background
Tom White was born in Bath, Somerset, England, and he served with the Manchester Regiment during World War I.

Playing career

International honours
Tom White was a non-playing reserve-to-travel for England (RU) against Ireland in the 1904 Home Nations Championship match at Rectory Field, Blackheath, London on Saturday 13 February 1904, and he won caps for England (RL) while at Oldham in 1908 against Wales, in 1910 against Wales (2 matches), in 1911 against Wales, and Australia, and won a cap for Great Britain (RL) while at Oldham in 1908 against New Zealand.

County honours
Tom White won cap(s) for Somerset (RU) while at Bath/Bristol, and won cap(s) for Lancashire (RL) while at Oldham.

Championship appearances
Tom White played in Oldham's victory in the Championship during the 1904–05 season, and played  and scored two tries in the 20–7 victory over Wigan in the Championship Final during the 1910–11 season at Wheater's Field, Broughton, Salford on Saturday 6 May 1911, in front of a crowd of 15,543.

Challenge Cup Final appearances
Tom White played  i.e. number 2, in Oldham's 3–17 defeat by Warrington in the 1907 Championship Final during the 1906–07 season at Wheater's Field, Broughton, Salford on Saturday 27 April 1907, in front of a crowd of 18,500.

County Cup Final appearances
Tom White played  in Oldham's 16–9 victory over Broughton Rangers in the 1907–08 Lancashire County Cup Final during the 1907–08 season at Athletic Grounds, Rochdale on Saturday 30 November 1907, in front of a crowd of 14,000, played  in the 9–10 defeat by Wigan in the 1908–09 Lancashire County Cup Final during the 1908–09 season at Wheater's Field, Broughton, Salford on Saturday 19 December 1908, in front of a crowd of 20,000, played  in the 4–3 victory over Swinton in the 1910–11 Lancashire County Cup Final during the 1910–11 season at Wheater's Field, Broughton, Salford on Saturday 3 December 1910, in front of a crowd of 14,000, and played  in the 5–0 victory over Wigan in the 1913–14 Lancashire County Cup Final during the 1913–14 season at Wheater's Field, Broughton, Salford on Saturday 6 December 1913, in front of a crowd of 18,000,

Club career
Tom White made his début for Bath against Knowle RFC (in Knowle, Bristol) on Saturday 15 February 1902, he transferred from Bath to Bristol, he transferred from Bristol to Bath, he played his last match for Bath against Taunton R.F.C. on Saturday 16 April 1904, he changed rugby football codes from rugby union to rugby league when he transferred from Bath to Oldham during February 1905, he made his début for Oldham in the 8–5 victory over Bradford F.C. at Watersheddings, Oldham on Monday 20 March 1905, he scored his last try, and played his last match for Oldham in the 7–10 defeat by Leigh at Mather Lane (adjacent to the Bridgewater Canal), Leigh on Saturday 13 December 1913.

References

External links
Search for "White" at espn.co.uk (RU)
Statistics at bathrugbyheritage.org
Match Reports - 1903-1904 at bathrugbyheritage.org
Match Reports - 1904-1905 at bathrugbyheritage.org
1905-1906 Anecdotes at bathrugbyheritage.org
Search for "Thomas White" at britishnewspaperarchive.co.uk
Search for "Tom White" at britishnewspaperarchive.co.uk

Army rugby union players
Bath Rugby players
Bristol Bears players
British Army personnel of World War II
England national rugby league team players
English rugby league players
English rugby union players
Great Britain national rugby league team players
Lancashire rugby league team players
Manchester Regiment soldiers
Oldham R.L.F.C. players
Place of birth missing
Place of death missing
Rugby league five-eighths
Rugby league halfbacks
Rugby league players from Somerset
Rugby league wingers
Rugby union halfbacks
Rugby union players from Bath, Somerset
Year of birth unknown
Year of death unknown